Ague  may refer to:
 Fever
 Malaria
 Agué, Benin
 Duck ague, a hunting term

See also
 Kan Ague, a residential area of Patikul, Sulu, Philippines